Wolftown is an unincorporated community located in Madison County, Virginia.

Graves Mill and the Hoffman Round Barn are listed on the National Register of Historic Places.

References

Board of Geographic Names reference

Unincorporated communities in Virginia
Unincorporated communities in Madison County, Virginia